Machalilla may refer to:
Machalilla culture, an ancient culture/people in Ecuador
Machalilla Parish, a rural parish of Puerto López Canton, Manabí Province
Machalilla National Park, a national park around Machalilla Parish